King's Highway 65, commonly referred to as Highway 65, is a provincially maintained highway in the Canadian province of Ontario. At its midpoint, the route is concurrent with Highway 11.

Highway 65 was assumed in 1937 following the merger of the Department of Northern Development (DND) with the Department of Highways (DHO). It initially connected Matachewan with Highway 11 at New Liskeard, but was extended east to the Quebec border in 1956. The route has remained unchanged since.

Route description 
Highway 65 travels from Highway 66 at a junction east of Matachewan, southeast to New Liskeard then northeast to the Quebec provincial border. With the exception of the community of Elk Lake, the section of the route between Highway 66 and Highway 11 passes through a remote and sparsely populated wilderness.
Highway 65 is entirely situated in Timiskaming District. It travels through the communities of Elk Lake, Kenabeek and New Liskeard.

The route's continuation into Quebec does not have a provincial route number, but has developed the name 'Rue Ontario' by the local town of Notre-Dame-du-Nord.

Like other provincial routes in Ontario, Highway 65 is maintained by the Ministry of Transportation of Ontario. In 2010, traffic surveys conducted by the ministry showed that on average, 4,200 vehicles used the highway daily along the section between Highway 11 and Armstrong Street in New Liskeard while 190 vehicles did so each day along the section between Highway 66 and the bridge over Sydney Creek, the highest and lowest counts along the highway, respectively.

History 
Highway 65 was first established on August7, 1937, when the New Liskeard to Matachewan Road was assumed by the DHO in the days following its merger with the DND on April1.
It has remained unchanged since.

Major intersections

References

External links 
Google Maps: Highway 65 route, Highway 66 (Matachewan) to New Liskeard segment
 Google Maps: Highway 65 route, New Liskeard to Quebec border segment
Highway 65 pictures and information

065
Highway 065